Acuvue (from "Accurate view") is a brand of disposable contact lenses made in Jacksonville Florida and Limerick-based Vistakon, a subsidiary of Johnson & Johnson (J&J).

Overview

Acuvue lenses got their start at Frontier Contact Lens Company, founded in Buffalo, New York in 1959 by Dr. Allen Isen, George Sitterle, and Dr. William Feinbloom. Its early growth was attributed to its highly successful toric lens. In 1962, Seymour Marco joined the venture and Frontier moved its operations to Jacksonville, Florida. With 30 employees, Frontier manufactured a line of hard contact lenses through the 1970s.

During the 1970s, Frontier developed a new material (etafilcon A), and the company began making soft lenses. Frontier was among the first in the US to take this material, widely used in Europe, and combine it with a lathe cutting process to produce soft contact lenses.

In 1981, Johnson & Johnson acquired Frontier Contact Lenses and renamed the company Vistakon. The production process at the time of sale was very manual––every employee on the production line handled the lenses, whether they were lathing, polishing, or inspecting. Vistakon decided to invest in a new production process in order to scale.

Utilizing Stabilized Soft Molding (SSM) technology, Vistakon undertook a major overhaul in its production processes. As a result, Acuvue was introduced to the market in 1987. The lens was originally indicated for seven-day extended wear and later became a daily wear lens. Today, there is a line which ranges from the 1-day wear to two-week lenses such as the Acuvue 2 and Oasys and the Vita monthly lens.

Today, all of Vistakon's manufacturing facilities are located in the United States, with the exception of one plant located in Limerick, Republic of Ireland.

Family of Acuvue brands
Daily Disposable Contact Lenses:
1-Day Acuvue Moist – (etafilcon A) hydrogel material (available for astigmatism and presbyopia). Introduced in 2006.
1-Day Acuvue TruEye – (narafilcon A) first silicone hydrogel daily disposable  released 2008 in European Markets and 2010 in North America.
1-Day Acuvue Define – hydrogel material (UK release solely in Boots and D&A opticians in 2010)
1-Day Acuvue Define Accent – hydrogel material (Far East markets)
1-Day Acuvue Oasys with HydraLuxe – (senofilcon A) silicone hydrogel material (available for astigmatism)

Two Week Disposable:
Acuvue 2 – (etafilcon A) hydrogel material. Introduced in 1999.
Acuvue Oasys – (senofilcon A) silicone hydrogel material (available for presbyopia in US and astigmatism in most other markets). Introduced in 2005.

Monthly Disposable:
Acuvue Vita – (senofilcon C) Methyl ether cellulose. Introduced in 2016.

Surevue was also produced by Vistakon but not under the Acuvue brand. Surevue contact lenses were a less expensive alternative to Acuvue.

Discontinued brands 
 Acuvue – (etafilcon A) Original 1–2 week lenses, introduced in 1987. Discontinued 3/31/2015.
 1-Day Acuvue – (etafilcon A) Original daily lenses, introduced in 1995. Discontinued 12/31/2017.
 Acuvue Advance – (galyfilcon A) Introduced in 2003. Discontinued 3/31/2015.

External links 

Acuvue.com (official US website)
Acuvue.com.au (official AU website)
Acuvue.co.uk (official UK website)
JJVision.com (official corporate website)
JnJVisionPro.com (product guide) – for eye care professionals
Acuvue.co.in (official India website)
Acuvuearabia.com (official Middle East website - Arabic)
En.acuvuearabia.com (official Middle East website - English)

References 

Johnson & Johnson brands
Contact lenses
Companies based in Jacksonville, Florida
Eyewear companies of the United States